Romer-Van Tassel House is a historic home located at Greenburgh, Westchester County, New York. It was built in 1793 and is a -story, rectangular stone dwelling, topped by a gable roof.  The coursed stone foundation may be the remains of an earlier dwelling and date to about 1684.  The house was renovated in the 1920s and the -story wood-frame kitchen wing dates to that time.  The house served as the first Greenburgh town hall from 1793 into the early 19th century.

It was added to the National Register of Historic Places in 1994.

See also
National Register of Historic Places listings in southern Westchester County, New York

References

Houses on the National Register of Historic Places in New York (state)
Houses completed in 1793
Houses in Westchester County, New York
Greenburgh, New York
National Register of Historic Places in Westchester County, New York
1793 establishments in New York (state)